Atlético Progresso Clube, commonly known as Progresso, is a Brazilian football club based in Mucajaí, Roraima state. They competed in the Série C three times.

History
The club was founded on July 21, 1959. They competed in the Série C for the first time in 1995, then again in 1997 and in 2008. The club was eliminated in the First Stage in all the three editions.

Stadium
Atlético Progresso Clube play their home games at Estádio Flamarion Vasconcelos, nicknamed Canarinho, located in Boa Vista. The stadium has a maximum capacity of 6,000 people.

References

Football clubs in Roraima
Association football clubs established in 1959
1959 establishments in Brazil